Eiken is a former municipality in the old Vest-Agder county, Norway.  The municipality existed from 1916 until its dissolution in 1963.  It was located in the northern half of the present-day municipality of Hægebostad in what is now Agder county. The administrative centre was the village of Eiken where Eiken Church is located.  The municipality included the far northern end of the Lyngdalen valley from the lake Lygne to the mountains in the north.

Name
The municipality (originally the parish) is named after the old Eiken farm.  The name of the farm means "oak tree".

History
The municipality of Eiken was established on 1 January 1916 when the municipality of Hægebostad was divided into two separate municipalities: Eiken (population: 932) and Hægebostad (population: 867). During the 1960s, there were many municipal mergers across Norway due to the work of the Schei Committee. On 1 January 1963, the two municipalities were reunited and together formed the municipality of Hægebostad. Before the merger the population of Eiken was 784.

Government
All municipalities in Norway, including Eiken, are responsible for primary education (through 10th grade), outpatient health services, senior citizen services, unemployment and other social services, zoning, economic development, and municipal roads.  The municipality was governed by a municipal council of elected representatives, which in turn elected a mayor.

Municipal council
The municipal council  of Eiken was made up of representatives that were elected to four year terms.  The party breakdown of the final municipal council was as follows:

See also
List of former municipalities of Norway

References

External links
Weather information for Eiken 

Hægebostad
Former municipalities of Norway
1916 establishments in Norway
1963 disestablishments in Norway